Emma Clayton is a British children's novelist and author of dystopian thrillers, The Roar and The Whisper. The Roar was nominated for the Carnegie Medal 2009, won the Yorkshire Coast Book Award and was selected for the USBBY 2010 Outstanding International Books Honor List  and the 2010 Texas Lone Star Reading List.

Life 
The daughter of a Royal Air Force officer, Emma Clayton moved frequently as a child until her father's death when she was seven years old. In her late teens, she trained as a field archaeologist, spent a brief time working as a freelance illustrator, then returned to education in her mid-twenties, studying film and screenwriting. She wrote her first novel when she was 26, following the birth of her daughter, then wrote The Roar several years later while studying for a Higher National Diploma in Visual Communications.

Clayton's first book, a middle grade novel called The Roar, was published by Chicken House in July 2008 in the United Kingdom and April 2009 in the United States. In February 2012, Chicken House published the sequel, The Whisper, in both the United Kingdom and United States. Both Roar and Whisper follow separated twins Mika and Ellie, who use a government scheme to find one another on a walled planet full of lies.

Awards and honors 
 USBBY Outstanding International Books Honor List, 2010
 Texas Library Association's Lone Star Reading List, 2010
 Yorkshire Coast Book Award, 2010

Published works 
 The Roar (Chicken House, 2008)
 The Whisper (Chicken House, 2012)

References

External links

Living people
British women novelists
21st-century British novelists
British children's writers
British women children's writers
21st-century British women writers
Year of birth missing (living people)